Valera is a city in Trujillo State in Venezuela, situated between the rivers Momboy and Motatán. The  mayor is José Karkom, who has had that post since 2013. The city is home to Italian, Portuguese, Chinese, Colombian and Spanish communities. It is also home to the Universidad Valle del Momboy, a private university, as well as the Instituto Universitario de Tecnología de Trujillo (IUTET). Also, the Universidad Nacional Experimental Simón Rodríguez (UNESR), the Universidad Pedagógica Experimental Libertador (UPEL), among others.

Economy
The city is the commercial center of Trujillo state, and a gateway to the Andes region of Venezuela. It has a vibrant business community, as well as a diverse and educated workforce. As the economic and commercial center of Trujillo state,  Valera is a leading distribution centre for the agricultural products in Venezuela, in which sugarcane, cacao, coffee, fruit, and grains are cultivated. Flour milling is a principal industry. The area has traditionally supplied about one-fourth of the nation's wheat. Valera has modern commercial buildings, such as: Plaza mall, Arichuna mall, Centro Comercial las Acacias, CC Edivica, CC.Vigen del Carmen, CC Diego Andres, CC Canaima,  Ateneo (cultural activity), Hotels, Avenues, Park of Illustrious (Parque de Los Ilustres) and Agricultural Fair Park (Parque Ferial Agropecuario), named for its founders.

History

Valera has its name from Marcos Valera. The date of its founding is not certain, although several historians agree that it was founded on 25 August 1811. Others say that it was in 1817 on land owned by Doña Mercedes Diaz de Teran and Dr. Gabriel Briceno. The location of Valera is privileged for its commercial and industrial development, because it is a point of intersection between the routes: Mérida - Maracaibo - Caracas - San Cristóbal.

Parish Seat

The municipality is composed of six parishes: Juan Ignacio Montilla, la Beatriz, la Puerta, Mendoza Fria, Mercedes Diaz and San Luis.

Media
The city has three daily papers, the Diario de Los Andes, Todo Primicias and the Diario El Tiempo, along with several radio stations, including Angel FM 93.7. Others include Radio Única. Valera also publishes the Magazine Cars Trujillo, its first magazine about cars.

Transport
The city has a national airport, Antonio Nicolas Briceño Airport, with a 2.000 meters runway which connects the region with the capital Caracas.

Newspapers
Diario de Los Andes (Daily)
Weather Journal
Diario El Tiempo (Daily)

Television
The city of Valera has three regional channels:
Plus TV, UHF channel 48 and channel 7 on cable.
Come TV, channel 8 on cable.
TV Andes (in testing), channel 16 and 10 on cable.
Also is available Directv and Intercable with an extended grill with more than 50 international channels.

Sports
Home of Trujillanos FC (Venezuelan soccer league) a first division soccer club that has its headquarters in the Luis Loreto Lira complex.

Notable people
José Manuel Pirela (born 1989), baseball second baseman and outfielder for the Philadelphia Phillies

References

External links 

 
Cities in Trujillo (state)